Mohammed Dikko Abubakar, CFR, NPM, mni (Rtd) is a Nigerian Policeman and former Inspector General of Police. He was appointed in 2012 to succeed Hafiz Ringim and was succeeded by Suleiman Abba in 2014. He is currently the Pro Chancellor and Chairman of council Al-Hikma University, Ilorin and also the President of Alumni Association of the National Institute (AANI).

Early life
Abubakar was born in Gusau, a city of then Sokoto State, which is also the capital of today Zamfara State. The firstborn of a family of many, his father is an Islamic scholar and farmer.

References

Nigerian police chiefs
1960 births
Living people
University of Lagos alumni